The list of English translations from medieval sources: D provides an overview of notable medieval documents—historical, scientific, ecclesiastical and literature—that have been translated into English. This includes the original author, translator(s) and the translated document. Translations are from Old and Middle English, Old French, Old Norse, Latin, Arabic, Greek, Persian, Syriac, Ethiopic, Coptic, Armenian, and Hebrew, and most works cited are generally available in the University of Michigan's HathiTrust digital library and OCLC's WorldCat. Anonymous works are presented by topic.

List of English translations

DA–DE
Dadīshōʿ Ḳaṭrāya. Dadīshōʿ Ḳaṭrāya (7th century) was a Nestorian monk and author of ascetic literature in Syriac.

 A treatise on solitude by Dadīshōʿ Ḳaṭrāya (1934). Edited and translated by Iraqi historian Alphonse Mingana (1878–1937). In Woodbrooke Studies: Christian Documents in Syriac, Arabic, and Garshūni, Volume VII (1934), pp. 70–143, 201–247.
Dafydd ap Gwilym. Dafydd ap Gwilym (c. 1315 – c. 1370) was one of the leading Welsh poets in the Middle Ages and was a contemporary of Chaucer's.

 Poems translated from the Welsh of Dafydd ap Gwilym (1818). By William Owen Pughe (1759–1835). In Cambrian register, Volume III (1818), pp. 436–468.
 Translations into English verse from the poems of Davyth ap Gwilym, a Welsh bard of the fourteenth century (1834). By a translator only identified as Maelog, with A sketch of the life of Davyth ap Gwilym. Dedicated to William Owen Pughe.
 The poetry of Dafydd ap Gwilym (1925). Translated by E. C. Knowlton. In Poet lore., Volume XXXVI (1925), pp. 415–433.
 Dafydd ap Gywilym: fifty poems (1942). Translated by Harold Idris Bell (1879–1967) and David Bell. In Y Cymmrodor, Volume XLVIII (1942).
Daniel (abbot). Daniel the Pilgrim (fl. c. 1107), also known as Daniel the Higumenos (abbot), was an eastern Christian who travelled from Kievan Rus’ to the Holy Land. He documented his travels in his .

 The pilgrimage of the Russian abbot Daniel in the Holy Land, 1106–1107 AD (1895). Translated and edited by British archaeologist Charles W. Wilson (1836–1905). In the library of Palestine Pilgrims' Text Society (PPTS), Volume IV, Part 3.

Dante Alighieri. Dante Alighieri (c. 1265 – 1321) was an Italian poet, writer and philosopher, author of the Divine Comedy. A relatively small sample of biographies and translations of Dante are shown below, with various bibliographies.

 The earliest lives of Dante (1901). By Italian humanist, historian and statesman Leonardo Arentino Bruni (c. 1370 – 1444). Translated from the Italian of Giovanni Boccaccio and Lionardo Bruni Aretino [Leonardo Arentino Bruni] by James Robinson Smith (1876–1954). In Yale Studies in English, Volume 10 (1901).
 The early lives of Dante (1904). By Leonardo A. Bruni. Translated by English economist and medievalist Philip Henry Wicksteed (1844–1927), derived from the translation of J. R. Smith.
 Dante (1900). By English scholar of Italian literature Edmund Garratt Gardner (1869–1935).
 Dante and Giovanni del Virgilio (1902), by Philip H. Wicksteed and Edmund G. Gardner.
 Il Fiore and Il Fiore and Detto d'Amore (2000). A late 13th-century Italian translation of the Roman de la Roseattributable to Dante Alighieri. Edited and translated by Santa Casciani and Christopher Kleinhenz.
 The new life: (La vita nuova) (1907). An edition of La vita nuova, translated by English poet Dante Gabriel Rossetti (1828–1882), with an introduction by American author Charles Eliot Norton (1827–1908). Also includes: One hundred sonnets, by Francesco Petrarch; La fiammetta, by Giovanni Boccaccio; and Poems, by Michelangelo Buonarroti.
 De vulgari eloquentia: Dante's book of exile (1990). A translation of Dante's Latin essay De vulgari eloquentia (1302-1305) by Marianne Shapiro.
 The Convivio of Dante Alighieri (1903). An edition of Convivio (The Banquet), translated by Philip H. Wicksteed.
 De monarchia (1879). In Dante: An essay, by Richard William Church (1815–1890). Includes an edition of De monarchia, translated by Frederick John Church (1854–1888).
 The vision: or, Hell, Purgatory and Paradise of Dante Alighieri (1892). A later edition of the first English language translation of the Divine Comedy, first published in 1782, by the Rev. Henry Francis Cary (1772–1844). With a life of Dante, chronological view of his age, additional notes, and an index.
 The Divine Comedy of Dante Alighieri (1867–1871). Translated by Henry Wadsworth Longfellow (1807–1882).
 Inferno: a translation from Dante Alighieri, into English blank verse (1812). A translation of the Inferno by Joseph Hume (1777–1855).
 The Purgatorio of Dante Alighieri (1912). An edition of Purgatorio. Edited by H. Oelsner, responsible for the Italian text and notes at the end of the cantos. Translated into English by Italian translator Thomas Okey (1852–1935), with contributions by Philip H. Wicksteed.
 The Paradiso of Dante Alighieri (1912). An edition of Paradiso, edited and translated by Philip H. Wicksteed, with Herman Oelsner (born 1871).
 Eclogae Latinae (1902). A critical edition of Eclogae, in Dante and Giovanni del Virgilio (1902), by Philip H. Wicksteed and Edmund G. Gardner.
 Dante: Quaestio de aqua et terra (1909). Dante's work, dated 1320, is a Latin discussion in Latin of a problem in medieval cosmology, is edited and translated by Charles Lancelot Shadwell (1840–1919).
 Catalogue of the Dante collection, 2 volumes plus addition (1898–1900). Presented by American librarian Willard Fiske (1831–1904) and compiled by Theodore Wesley Koch (1871–1941). Additions (1898–1920) compiled by Mary Fowler, curator of the Dante and Petrarch collections from 1907 to 1920. Includes works by Dante and works about Dante.
 Dante in America (1896–1897). Includes a bibliography of American translations and studies of Dante. By Theodore W. Koch. Reprinted from the Fifteenth annual report of the Dante Society (1896).
 A chronological list of English translations from Dante, from Chaucer to the present day, 1380–1906. By British Dantean scholar Paget Jackson Toynbee (1855–1932). Reprinted in the Twenty-fourth annual report of the Dante Society (1906).
 Bibliography of works by Dante.
 English translations of the Divine Comedy.

DH–DU
Dragon myths. Dragons in mythology.

 The Celtic dragon myth (1911). By John Francis Campbell (1821–1885), with the Geste of Fraoch and the dragon, translated with introduction by Scottish Gaelic scholar George Henderson (1866–1912). Illustrations in colour by Rachel Ainslie Grant Duff.

Dream of the Rood. The Dream of the Rood is an Old English Christian poems in the genre of dream poetry and written in alliterative verse. Preserved in the 10th-century Vercelli Book, the poem may be as old as the 8th-century Ruthwell Cross, and is considered as one of the oldest works of Old English literature.

 The Holy Rood, a dream (1866). A translation of the poem Dream of the Rood, once attributed to Cynewulf or Cædmon. In The Ruthwell cross, Northumbria (1866), by English archeologist and philologist George Stephens (1813–1895).

Dryden, John. John Dryden (1631–1700) was an English poet, literary critic, translator, and playwright who was appointed England's first Poet Laureate in 1668.

 Fables ancient and modern; translated into verse, from Homer, Ovid, Boccace, and Chaucer: with original poems (1721). The third edition of Dryden's 1700 work Fables ancient and modern.
 Dryden's Palamon and Arcite; or The Knight's tale from Chaucer (1899). A Dryden translation, Palamon and Arcite, from his Fables, Ancient and Modern. Edited with notes and an introduction by Percival Ashley Chubb (1860–1959).
 Poetical Miscellanies, The Sixth Part (1709) by Alexander Pope. An edition of Poetical Miscellanies, The Sixth Part by Alexander Pope. Edited by J. Dryden.

Source material

Cambrian register
Fifteenth annual report of the Dante Society
Palestine Pilgrims' Text Society (PPTS), Library of
Twenty-fourth annual report of the Dante Society
Woodbrooke Studies: Christian Documents in Syriac, Arabic, and Garshūni
Yale Studies in English
Y Cymmrodor

See also
 Annals
 Arabic literature
 Islamic literature
 Medieval literature

References

 
11
Translations into English
Translation-related lists